FPT Industrial is an Italian multinational designer and manufacturer of transmissions, axles, diesel and petrol engines that was established in March 2005 as a Fiat Group division which included all the activities related to powertrains and transmissions. The company was formed following the dissolution of the alliance between Fiat and General Motors.

Between 2005 and 2011, the company also included industrial and commercial powertrain activities that were subsequently spun off as a separate entity named FPT Industrial, which is currently an Iveco Group brand.

The company has activities in nine different countries, it has 10 plants and around 20,000 employees. With output of around 2.9 million engines and 2.4 million transmissions and axles annually, FPT Industrial is one of the largest companies in the powertrain sector.

FPT innovations

 Variable Valve Timing (1960). First patent of automotive variable valve timing
 Common Rail technology (1997). Patent sold to Robert Bosch later
 MultiJet system (2003)
 MultiAir technology (2009)
 TwinAir two-cylinder engine (2010)
 Euro Twin Clutch Transmission (2010)

Current status
As a result of partial and proportional demerger of Fiat S.p.A. to Fiat Industrial S.p.A., Fiat Powertrain Technologies S.p.A. was split into Fiat Powertrain and FPT Industrial S.p.A. on January 1, 2011.

FPT Industrial S.p.A. is now part of Iveco Group and produces powertrains for On-Road, Off-Road, Marine and Power Generation applications.

See also

List of Italian companies

References

External links

Iveco
Engine manufacturers of Italy
Manufacturing companies based in Turin
Manufacturing companies established in 2005
Italian brands
Automotive transmission makers
Diesel engine manufacturers
Marine engine manufacturers
Electrical generation engine manufacturers
Locomotive engine manufacturers
Auto parts suppliers of Italy
Motor vehicle engine manufacturers